East Yorkshire operates both local and regional bus services in the East Riding of Yorkshire and North Yorkshire, England. Prior to acquisition by the Go-Ahead Group in June 2018, the company was known as East Yorkshire Motor Services.

History

East Yorkshire Motor Services was originally made up of two companies, Lee & Beaulah (set up by Ernest John Lee) and Hull & District Motor Services (set up by H.A. Harvey). In October 1926, British Electric Traction purchased the two companies.

In 1968, the British Electric Traction group was sold to the Transport Holding Company, which in turn became the National Bus Company in the following year.

Until 1972, the company's livery was dark blue with a primrose band, with a white relief band also applied to the roofline of buses. Shortly after East Yorkshire was brought under National Bus Company ownership, the primrose band was changed to white and buses were given NBC corporate fleet names. This proved to be short-lived, with the adapted livery being replaced by the standard "poppy" red in October 1973.

In 1987, following the deregulation of bus services, East Yorkshire's fleet, which had since dropped to 200 vehicles and shared management with Lincolnshire Road Car, started to grow again. The company was sold in a management buyout, which was led by seven managers. In the same year, the company acquired former United Automobile Services depots in Pickering and Scarborough, with operations rebranded Scarborough & District.

Following the management buyout, East Yorkshire began to expand, acquiring many independent operators in the local area, including Connor & Graham, Cottingham Mini Coaches and Primrose Valley Coaches. The Hardwick's of Scarborough fleet was purchased from Wallace Arnold – this being Wallace Arnold's last bus company.

At the time of privatisation, the livery was silver and blue, with some vehicles branded in the National Bus Company's "poppy" red livery or silver, blue and red minibus livery. The "poppy" red buses were subsequently rebranded into a red and grey livery. In Hull, a number of AEC Routemaster double-deck vehicles entered service in the traditional East Yorkshire livery to compete with Kingston upon Hull City Transport. The company also suffered competition from Appleby's of Conisholme in Bridlington, Hull and Scarborough, prior to the competitor's sale to the Bowen Transport Group in December 2000.

In 1992, the company completed their first out-of-area acquisition with Finglands Coachways, with further purchases that year including Hull-based Metro Citybus, as well as Rhodes Coaches and Thornton Dale Coaches.

By the turn of the decade, the company had made a significant number of acquisitions: Connor & Graham of Easington (1993), Hart Coaches of Stockton-on-Tees (1995), former GM Buses coaching arm Charterplan (1996), Hollings Coaches of North Shields (1996), Armstrong Galley (1997) and Kingstonian Travel Services (1997).

In January 2004, the company proceeded with a second out-of-area acquisition, with the purchase of Whittle Coach & Bus of Kidderminster. In December 2014, the coach operation was sold to Johnsons Coach & Bus Travel.

In March 2009, the company purchased the Hull-based operations of Veolia Transport. The sale saw all driving and engineering staff transferred to East Yorkshire Motor Services, along with services and nine vehicles.

In May 2014, the company's Driffield depot was closed, with most staff, services and vehicles reallocated to nearby depots. In the same month, the company commenced commercial operation of the Moors Explorer ME1 service, which replaced the former Moorsbus M13 and M14 services. The service operates on Sunday and bank holidays between May and August, running between Hessle, Hull, Beverley and Danby via Malton and Pickering – closely following the route of the former services.

In May 2015, East Yorkshire Motor Services was the first operator in the United Kingdom to take delivery of the MCV EvoSeti. Following further deliveries in January 2017 and September 2017, an additional eighteen vehicles were added to the fleet.

In May 2018, the company's Hornsea depot was closed, with the depot's 27 drivers and engineers offered roles elsewhere in the company. The following year, it was announced that the company's Beverley depot was to be closed, with operations relocated to Hull.

Out-of-area acquisitions

Finglands Coachways
The company's first out-of-area expansion was in early 1992, following the purchase of Finglands Coachways of Rusholme. In October 1995, the original operation of Stagecoach Manchester was also purchased.

In August 2013, FirstGroup announced that subject to regulatory approval by the Office of Fair Trading, it had agreed to purchase the bus operations of Finglands Coachways. The sale included the lease of the company's depot in Rusholme, as well as routes, and approximately 100 members of staff – but no vehicles. The deal was approved in January 2014, with First Greater Manchester taking over on operations in February 2014.

In October 2013, East Yorkshire Motor Services sold the Finglands Coachways coach charter business to Bullocks Coaches.

Whittle Bus & Coach
Whittle Bus & Coach of Kidderminster was acquired by East Yorkshire Motor Services in January 2004. This was the second major out-of-area acquisition for the company, following the management buyout in February 1987. The business operated a total of 50 vehicles at the time of purchase, running bus services in rural Shropshire and Worcestershire.

In December 2014, the coach operation was sold to Johnsons Coach & Bus Travel, along with nine coaches. Following the sale, the company's National Express contracted services were transferred to other operators, with local bus services withdrawn in January 2015.

Acquisition by the Go-Ahead Group
In June 2018, East Yorkshire Motor Services was acquired by the Go-Ahead Group, bringing an end to 30 years of family ownership. East Yorkshire will continue to run as a standalone company within Go North East. In October 2018, the company invested a total of £1 million in new Ticketer smart ticket machines – which include the ability to accept contactless and mobile payments.

In March 2019, a new livery and corporate branding was announced. The new livery is an evolution of the well-known burgundy and cream colour scheme. Under the changes, the trading name for the company was changed to East Yorkshire, with a new typeface and logo design, with the white rose of Yorkshire replacing the letter O and forming part of the logo. The new corporate branding was launched at an event at KCOM Stadium, with two vehicles displayed in the new livery.

In August 2020, the EastRider premium sub-brand was launched. The first services to be upgraded were services 45 and X46, which link Bridlington and Hull with York. A total of eight Alexander Dennis Enviro 400 MMC double-deck vehicles were ordered for this upgrade.

In January 2021, services 75 and X7, which operate between Hull and Withernsea were encompassed under the sub-brand, using refurbished MCV EvoSeti double-deck vehicles. At the same time, services 55 and X5, which operate between Goole and Hull were brought under the sub-brand, using a fleet of former National Express Volvo B9R/Caetano Levante coaches and Volvo B9TL/Wright Gemini 2 double-deck vehicles cascaded from Go North East.

In June 2022, it was announced that East Yorkshire would be split from Go North East, becoming a separate company of the Go-Ahead Group. Following the departure of Martijn Gilbert at Go North East in August 2022, Ben Gilligan, who previously served as East Yorkshire's Area Director since the company's takeover, has been promoted to Managing Director at East Yorkshire.

Fleet and operations

Depots 
As of May 2022, the company operates from seven bus depots across the region: Bridlington, Elloughton, Kingston upon Hull, Pocklington, Scarborough (Barry's Lane & Westwood Road) and Withernsea.

The company's headquarters are located at a main depot on Anlaby Road in Kingston upon Hull. The depot's offices, built into a set of 1870s Gothic Revival houses, are Grade II listed. A small fire broke out in one of the offices in December 2020, and a partial collapse of the depot's roof and frontage on 18 January 2023 destroyed a bus parked in the depot forecourt.

A new depot for Scarborough bus services is to be built on Taylor Way in Eastfield, replacing both the Barry's Lane and Westwood Road sites. The depot, which will feature charging points for a potential investment in electric buses, is scheduled to be opened in mid-2024.

Vehicles 
As of 15 July 2021, the fleet consists of 271 buses and coaches. The fleet consists mainly of diesel-powered single and double-deck buses manufactured by Alexander Dennis and Volvo. The company also operate a fleet of open-top Volvo B7TL/Wright Eclipse Gemini double-deck vehicles, which operate seasonally on seafront services in Bridlington and Scarborough.

East Yorkshire Coaches 
The company operates a fleet of coaches for hire, day trips and short holidays under the East Yorkshire Coaches brand. They also operate regional and national coach services under contract to National Express. Between November 2001 and October 2007, East Yorkshire Coaches also traded as Frodingham Coaches, following acquisition of the company. The previous coaching operation, East Yorkshire Travel, was once a nationwide operator – prior to sale to the Godfrey Burley Group in 1996.

Preservation 
A fleet of preserved heritage vehicles are maintained by the company, which (as of July 2021) consists of a double-deck AEC Regent V (644; VKH 44) and an open-top double-deck Leyland Titan (202; 202 YTE).

In popular culture
In July 2014, the company was the subject of an eight-part documentary series, On The Yorkshire Buses. The documentary originally aired on Channel 5 and was narrated by Simon Farnaby.

In April 2021, the company was the subject of an episode of Dom Digs In, which aired on BBC One. Narrated by Dominic Littlewood and filmed over the course of a week during the COVID-19 pandemic, the episode sees Dominic take on a number of roles at the company's Hull depot.

Notes

References

External links 
 
 East Yorkshire Motor Services Limited on Companies House
 East Yorkshire website

Bus operators in the East Riding of Yorkshire
Coach operators in England
Companies based in Kingston upon Hull
Bus operators in North Yorkshire
Vintage bus operators in the United Kingdom
1926 establishments in England